Admiral Sir Lewis Anthony Beaumont,  (19 May 1847 – 20 June 1922) was a Royal Navy officer who served as Commander-in-Chief, Plymouth.

Naval career
Beaumont joined the Royal Navy as a boy in 1860 and was engaged in operations in Malaya by 1875. Between 1875 and 1876 he took part as senior lieutenant in the British Arctic Expedition led by George Nares on HMS Discovery, an attempt to reach the North Pole and to explore the NW coast of Greenland. Beaumont led a dogsled party that reached Sherard Osborn Fjord in May 1876 and left a cairn at Repulse Harbour.

He was given command of HMS Excellent in 1893, before becoming Director of Naval Intelligence in 1895. He went on to be Commander-in-Chief, Pacific Station in 1899 and Commander-in-Chief, Australia Station in 1900. During his time in Australia, he was knighted as a Knight Commander of the Order of St Michael and St George (KCMG) on the occasion of the visit of the Duke and Duchess of Cornwall and York (later King George V and Queen Mary). He was promoted to vice-admiral on 9 September 1902, and appointed Commander-in-Chief, Plymouth later the same year, serving as such until 1908. He was First and Principal Naval Aide-de-Camp to the King in 1911. He retired in 1912.

References

|-

|-

|-

|-

1847 births
1922 deaths
British people of French descent
Royal Navy admirals
Knights Commander of the Order of the Bath
Knights Commander of the Order of St Michael and St George
Directors of Naval Intelligence
Explorers of the Arctic